

s/he is the eponymous album by the musical duo s/he, released in September 2011. The duo consists of Michelle Chamuel and Tyler Duncan, former members of the Ann Arbor, Michigan-based band Ella Riot. The album was released shortly after the band's hiatus announcement. The album credits contributions by all then-current band members and as such is the last collaborative venture of the group. An album review categorized the music as electronic-pop/rock, differentiated it from traditional synthpop, and complimented the vocal performance and incorporation of guitars and drums.

Track listing

Personnel 
Credits adapted from Bandcamp music store.

 Michelle Chamuel – writer, performer, producer, recording, mixing, design, vocals
 Tyler Duncan – writer, performer, producer, recording, mixing, design
 Robert Lester – electric guitar, synthesizer
 Mike Shea – drums, percussion, glockenspiel
 Matt Henninger – bass, trumpet
 Devin Kerr – drums recording, additional mixing, mastering
 Jon Morgan – photography
 "World Divided" – written and produced by Chamuel, Duncan and Lester, programming by Lester

References

2011 albums
Michelle Chamuel albums